Elihu Yale (5 April 1649 – 8 July 1721) was a British-American colonial administrator and philanthropist. Although born in Boston, Massachusetts, he only lived in America as a child, spending the rest of his life in England, Wales and India. Starting as a clerk, he eventually rose up to the rank of President of the British East India Company settlement in Fort St George, Madras. He later lost that position under charges of corruption for self-dealing and had to pay a fine. In 1699, he returned to Britain with a considerable fortune, around £200,000, mostly made by selling diamonds, and spent his time and wealth toward philanthropy and art collecting. He is best remembered as the primary benefactor of Yale College (now Yale University), which was named in his honor, following a sizable donation of books, portrait and textiles under the request of Rev. Cotton Mather, a Harvard graduate. No direct descendants of his have survived to this day.

Early life 

Born in Boston, Massachusetts, to David Yale (1613–1690), a wealthy Boston merchant and attorney to Robert Rich, 2nd Earl of Warwick, and Ursula Knight; he was the grandson of Ann Yale (born Lloyd), daughter of Bishop George Lloyd, who, after the death of her first husband, Thomas Yale, Sr, (1587–1619), married Governor Theophilus Eaton (1590–1658). Governor Eaton was the co-founder of two of the Thirteen British Colonies, who are represented on the Flag of the United States, mainly through the Massachusetts Bay Colony and the New Haven Colony, and was the brother of Nathaniel Eaton, Harvard's first Headmaster and President designate, at the founding of Harvard in 1636. His son, Samuel Eaton, the uncle of Elihu, was implied in the foundation of Harvard as well, being one of the seven founders of the Harvard Corporation, the governing board and charter that incorporated Harvard in 1650. It was they, along with Elihu's uncle and aunt, Thomas Yale, Jr, and Anne Yale, Jr, who brought the reconstituted Eaton/Yale family to America, while other members of the family stayed in England. 

Elihu 's father, David Yale, would  later come from London to New Haven Colony with his stepfather, Theophilus Eaton, in 1639. He moved to Boston in 1641 and met & married Elihu Yale's mother, Ursula, in 1643. In 1652 at the age of three, Elihu Yale left New England, never to return, as David Yale took his family back to London. While scarce, a letter suggests that David Yale remained a successful merchant and settled his family in the Hanseatic merchant district "Steelyard Court". In 1662 at the age of thirteen, Elihu Yale entered the private school of William Dugard, but Dugard died a few months after Elihu Yale enrolled. Elihu Yale likely lived through the Great Plague of London, though no one in his family died; and the Great Fire of London.

East India Company
In 1670, at the age of 21, Elihu Yale became a clerk for the East India Company and served an apprenticeship in London in the Leadenhall Street office. It is possible that Elihu Yale had business training in his father's merchant counting house, and his father's connections helped him get the job. The following year in 1671, Yale was one of twenty men chosen as "Writers" in India. Elihu Yale was bonded for £500 with the help of his father and his brother David.

For 20 years Yale served the East India Company. In 1684, he became the first president of Fort St George, the company's post at Madras (now Chennai), India. He succeeded a number of agents from Andrew Cogan to William Gyfford. Yale was instrumental in the development of the Government General Hospital, housed at Fort St George.

Yale amassed a fortune while working for the company, largely through secret contracts with Madras merchants, against the East India Company's directive. By 1692, his repeated flouting of East India Company regulations and growing embarrassment at his illegal profiteering resulted in his being relieved of the post of governor.

Tenure as President of Madras 

Elihu Yale was re-appointed as president of the administration of Fort St George on 26 July 1687. He then implemented an order dated 14 January 1685 which required the English at Fort St George to make all attempts at procurement of the town of Santhome on lease. To this effect, Chinna Venkatadri was sent to negotiate with the local governor on 4 August 1687. The mission was successful and Venkatadri assumed sovereignty over Santhome for a period of three years. Notwithstanding the vehement protests of the Portuguese inhabitants of Santhome, the English gained absolute control over all lands up to St Thomas Mount for a period of three years.

In September 1688, the Mughal Emperor Aurangazeb took Golconda after a prolonged battle. The Mughals took the Sultan of Golconda prisoner and annexed the state. The newly designated Mughal Subedar of the province immediately sent a letter to the British authorities at Fort St George demanding that the English at Madras acknowledge the overlordship of the Mughal Emperor. The English complied willingly. Aurangazeb guaranteed the independence of Madras, but in return demanded that the English supply troops in the event of a war against the Marathas. It was around this time that Yale's three-year-old son David Yale died and was interred in the Madras cemetery.

The records of this period mention a flourishing slave trade in Madras. After English merchants began to kidnap young children and deport them to distant parts of the world, the administration of Fort St George stepped in and introduced laws to curb the practice. On 2 February 1688, Elihu Yale decreed that slaves should be examined by the judges of the choultry before being transported. Transportation of young children, in particular, was made unlawful. Beyond this, the nature of Yale's involvement in the slave trade remains disputed. A blog post by a Yale history Ph.D. candidate and manager of the Yale Slavery and Abolition Portal notes that he permitted a law that at least ten slaves should be carried on every ship bound for Europe and in his capacity as judge he also on several occasions sentenced so-called "black criminals" to whipping and enslavement. On the other hand, according to Steven Pincus, a former Yale professor of history and current professor at the University of Chicago, Yale was never a slave trader and never owned slaves – and in fact opposed the slave trade during his time as President of Madras.

During Yale's presidency, a plan for setting up a corporation in Madras was conceived by Josiah Child, the Governor of the East India Company, in a letter addressed to the factors at Madras on 28 September 1687. Three months later, Child and his deputy had an audience with King James II, and as per the ensuing discussions, a charter was issued by the King on 30 December 1687 which established the Corporation of Madras. The charter came into effect on 29 September 1688, and a Corporation was established comprising a Mayor, 12 Aldermen, 60-100 Burgesses and sergeants. Nathaniel Higginson, who was then the second member of the Council of Fort St George, took office as the Mayor of Madras.

In August 1689, a French fleet appeared near the coast of Ceylon compelling the Governor of Pulicat Lawrence Pitt who was on high seas to seek protection within the bastions of Fort St George. Throughout the year 1690, French naval ships from Pondicherry ravaged the coast in order to drive the English and the Dutch out of the East Indies but were unsuccessful. They eventually withdrew from their enterprise when faced with heavy losses. It was also during this time that the English purchased the town of Tegnapatnam from the Marathas.

Scandal 
After Jacques de Paiva's death in 1687, Elihu Yale fell in love with his widow Hieronima de Paiva and brought her to live with him, causing quite a scandal within Madras’s colonial society. Elihu Yale and Hieromima de Paiva had a son. The son died in South Africa.

Accusations of corruption and removal 

As president of Fort St George, Yale purchased territory for private purposes with East India Company funds, including a fort at Devanampattinam (now Cuddalore). Yale imposed high taxes for the maintenance of the colonial garrison and town, resulting in an unpopular regime and several revolts by Indians, brutally quelled by garrison soldiers. Yale was also notorious for arresting and trying Indians on his own private authority, including the hanging of a stable boy who had absconded with a Company horse.

Charges of corruption were brought against Elihu Yale in the last years of his presidency. He was eventually removed in 1692 and replaced with Nathaniel Higginson as the President of Madras.

Return to Britain

Yale returned to Britain in 1699, with a fortune that amounted to £200,000, mostly made by selling diamonds from the Golconda mines and the Kollur mines, in Southern India. Along with Jean Chardin and Jean-Baptiste Tavernier, the traveling merchant of Louis XIV, he was among the most important European diamond traders in the world, as nearly all diamonds came from India during that period. In relation to GDP, his fortune amounted to 1/4 % of the United Kingdom's GDP at the time, which translates to nearly 6 billion British pounds in 2021 money. He kept doing business with his friends Governor Thomas Pitt and Sir Charles Cotterell, during the era where London became the international trading centre of diamonds, dislodging Portugal and the Netherlands. 
 
He spent the rest of his life at Plas Grono on the Erddig estate, a mansion in Wrexham bought by his father, and at his main London residence in Queen's Square. He had four houses in London as well as several coach houses and stables to store his vast art collection of more than 10,000 items consisting of paintings, jewels, pictures, books, watches, swords, and other items. A famous object of his collection was one of the Jewels of Mary, Queen of Scots as well as a painting from Dutch painter Adriaen van der Werff. Other notable artists whose works were part of his collection were Bruegel, Van Dyck, Dürer, Rubens and Rembrandt. He also leased Latimer House from his son-in-law, Lord James Cavendish, son of the 1st Duke of Devonshire, to accommodate his daughter Ursula. 

Elihu was later elected High Sheriff of Denbighshire in Wales, and became a Fellow of the Royal Society in 1717. Around 1719, he was a subject in the painting Elihu Yale with Members of his Family and an Enslaved Child.

Marriage and children 

Elihu Yale married Catherine Hynmers in 1680, widow of Joseph Hynmers, second-in-command of Fort St George, India as Deputy Governor for the East India Company. The wedding took place at St Mary's Church, at Fort St George, where Yale was a vestryman and treasurer. The marriage was the first registered at the church.

They had 4 children together.

David Yale (died 1687) died young.

Katherine Yale (died 1715) married Dudley North of Glemham Hall, son of Sir Dudley North of Camden Place, and Anne Cann, daughter of Sir Robert Cann, 1st Baronet of Compton Greenfield, Gloucestershire. He was a cousin of Francis North, 1st Earl of Guilford of Wroxton Abbey and a grandson of Anne Montagu of Boughton House, member of the House of Montagu. Their daughter Anne North would marry Nicholas Herbert, member of the House of Herbert, son of the 8th Earl of Pembroke, Thomas Herbert of Wilton House and his first wife, Margaret Sawyer of Highclere Castle while one of their sons, William Dudley North, would marry Lady Barbara Herbert, daughter of Thomas and his second wife, Barbara Herbert, Countess of Pembroke. Nicholas's only daughter, Barbara, would marry the 2nd Earl of Aldborough, Edward Stratford, member of the House of Stratford.

Anne Yale (died 1734), married Lord James Cavendish of Staveley Hall, member of the House of Cavendish, son of William Cavendish, 1st Duke of Devonshire of Chatsworth House  and Lady Mary Butler, member of the House of Butler and daughter of James Butler, 1st Duke of Ormonde of Kilkenny Castle. James was also a grandson of Countess Elizabeth Cecil of Hatfield House, member of the Salisbury's House of Cecil, a great-grandson of Countess Catherine Howard of Audley End House, member of the House of Howard, and a nephew of John Cecil, 5th Earl of Exeter of Burghley House, member of the Exeter's House of Cecil.

Ursula Yale (died 1721), died childless at Latimer House, the house was rented by Elihu Yale from his son-in-law Lord James Cavendish, husband of Anne Yale, and is buried in the small church on the estate, St Mary Magdalene.

Death 

Yale died on 8 July 1721 in London. His body was buried in the churchyard of the parish church of St Giles' Church, Wrexham, Wales. His tomb is inscribed with these lines:

In Boston, Massachusetts, a tablet to Yale was erected in 1927 at Scollay Square, near the site of Yale's birth. Yale president Arthur Twining Hadley penned the inscription, which reads: "On Pemberton Hill, 255 Feet North of This Spot, Was Born on April Fifth 1649 Elihu Yale, Governor of Madras, Whose Permanent Memorial in His Native Land is the College That Bears His Name."

Yale University
In 1718, Cotton Mather contacted Yale and asked for his help. Mather represented a small institution of learning that had been founded in 1701 in Old Saybrook, Connecticut, as the Collegiate School of Connecticut, which needed money for a new building. Yale sent Mather 417 books, a portrait of King George I, and nine bales of goods. These last were sold by the school for £800. In gratitude, officials named the new building Yale; eventually the entire institution became Yale College.

Yale was also a vestryman and treasurer of St Mary's Church at Fort St George. On 6 October 1968, the 250th anniversary of the naming of Yale College for Elihu Yale, the classmates of Chester Bowles, then the American ambassador to India and a graduate of Yale (1924), donated money for lasting improvements to the church and erected a plaque to commemorate the occasion. In 1970, a portrait of him, Elihu Yale seated at table with the Second Duke of Devonshire and Lord James Cavendish was donated to the Yale Center for British Art from Chatsworth House.

On 5 April 1999, Yale University recognised the 350th anniversary of Yale's birthday. An article that year in American Heritage magazine rated Elihu Yale the "most overrated philanthropist" in American history, arguing that the college that became Yale University was successful largely because of the generosity of a man named Jeremiah Dummer, but that the trustees of the school did not want it known by the name "Dummer College".

In her article for The Atlantic about Skull and Bones, a secret society at Yale University, Alexandra Robbins alleges that Yale's headstone was stolen years ago from its proper setting in Wrexham. She further alleges that the tombstone is now displayed in a glass case in a room with purple walls.

Slave Trade 

One of Elihu Yale's responsibilities as president of Fort St George was overseeing its slave trade, though he was never a slave trader, never owned slaves, opposed the slave trade, and imposed several restrictions on it during his tenure. Dave Collins argues that there is no evidence for Yale ever having enslaved anyone himself but adds that relatives in New Haven likely did.

Nonetheless, critics argue that he benefited from the trade by having it as one of his responsibilities as President, despite not owning any of the enslaved people or profiting from their sales. Elizabeth Kuebler-Wolf in the Journal of Global History argues that Yale enslaved at least one person (maybe two) as a household slave, as indicated by Hiram Bingham's book Elihu Yale. In a 2020 piece for the New Haven Independent, Sean O'Brien notes that some Fort St George archival material indicates that Yale punished Indians with enslavement.

Ancestry 

The ancestry of the Yale family can be traced back from Chancellor Thomas Yale, born 1525, to many Royal and Noble houses of Britain as descendants of the Royal House of Mathrafal, the Royal House of Aberffraw, the Royal House of Plantagenet, the Princely House of Powys Fadog, the Tudors of Penmynydd and many others. For the House of Mathrafal, and Powys Fadog, it was through Tudur ap Gruffudd, Lord of Gwyddelwern and brother of the last native Prince of Wales, Owain Glyndŵr, while for the House of Aberffraw, and the Tudors of Penmynydd, it was  through Elen Ferch Tomos, the mother of Owain. From these families they inherited Lordships and estates, such as Plas yn Iâl (Yale).

The Coat of arms of the Yales came originally in the family from Osborn Fitzgerald, Lord of Ynys-m-Maengwyn and Corsygedol, of which they were the direct descendants, and was used to create the coat of arms of Yale College. Osborn Fitzgerald was a member of the House of Fitzgerald through the Earls of Desmond. He made the trip from Ireland to Wales during the thirteenth century with Gruffydd ab Ednyved Vychan, son of Seneschal Ednyfed Fychan, and was granted Lordships by the Prince of North Wales, Llywelyn the Great. He was the progenitor of many houses in Wales, including the House of Yale, co-representative of the Sovereign Dynasties of Powys, North Wales, and South Wales. The House of Yale is, on the paternal side, a cadet branch of the Royal House of Mathrafal, through the Princes of Powys Fadog, and a cadet branch of the Fitzgerald Dynasty, through the Merioneth House of Corsygedol.

The family estate at Plas yn Iâl ("Iâl" is anglicised as "Yale"), North Wales, of which the family took the name, was inherited from Baron Elissau ab Gruffydd, a member of the Royal House of Mathrafal and descendant of the Royal House of Plantagenet, when he married Margaret, the heiress of Plas yn Yale, in the Lordship of Bromfield and Yale. Her ancestor, Lord Mostyn, was granted the estate by the Prince of Wales, Owain Gwynedd, for his services at the Battle of Crogen in 1165. Elissau ab Gruffydd was the grandfather of Chancellor Thomas Yale, who was the first to adopt definitively the Yale surname, and had, as his ancestor, Prince Gruffudd Fychan I, the Lord of Yale. The estate was originally called Allt Llwyn Dragon, which means Dragon's Grove Hill.

Cultural references 
Elihu later became the name of a "senior society" founded in 1903 at Yale.
Tom Wolfe, who earned a Ph.D. in American Studies from Yale, named the African-American Atlanta police chief in A Man in Full Elihu Yale.
Yale College, a former college in Wrexham, Wales, which has since merged with Coleg Cambria, was also named after Elihu Yale.
Theodore Roosevelt's son Quentin kept a hyacinth macaw named Eli Yale.

Notes

References 

 Bingham, Hiram (1939). Elihu Yale: The American Nabob of Queen Square. New York, NY: Dodd, Mead & Company.
 Scarisbrick, Diana and Zucker, Benjamin (2014). Elihu Yale: Merchant, Collector & Patron. London. Thames & Hudson Ltd. .
 Yale, Rodney Horace (1908). Yale Genealogy and History of Wales. Beatrice, Nebraska, U.S.A. Milburn & Scott Company. Listed in Worldcat and archived at the Internet Archive.

External links

Elihu Yale collection (MS 566). Manuscripts and Archives, Yale University Library. 

 
 

 
 

1649 births
1721 deaths
People from Wrexham
British North America
British philanthropists
British East India Company people
History of Chennai
Businesspeople from Boston
Presidents of Madras
Merchants from London
Welsh educational theorists
Yale University
Benefactors of Yale University
Fellows of the Royal Society